Yūgo, Yugo or Yuugo is a masculine Japanese given name.

Possible writings
Yūgo can be written using many different combinations of kanji characters. Here are some examples:

勇五, "courage, five"
勇伍, "courage, five"
勇吾, "courage, I/my"
勇悟, "courage, realize/become aware"
勇護, "courage, protect"
雄伍, "masculine, five"
雄吾, "masculine, I/my"
雄悟, "masculine, realize/become aware"
悠五, "calm, five"
悠吾, "calm, I/my"
悠悟, "calm, realize/become aware"
優吾, "gentleness, I/my"
優悟, "gentleness, realize/become aware"
有護, "have, protect"
友悟, "friend, realize/become aware"
祐午, "help, noon/sign of the horse"
裕吾, "abundant, I/my"

The name can also be written in hiragana ゆうご or katakana ユウゴ.

Yūgō or Yuugou is a separate Japanese given name, though it may be romanized the same way Yugo.

勇剛, "courage, strength"
勇豪, "courage, overpowering"
雄剛, "masculine, strength"
雄豪, "masculine, overpowering"
悠剛, "calm, strength"
悠豪, "calm, overpowering"
優剛, "gentleness, strength"
優豪, "gentleness, overpowering"
有剛, "have, strength"
友剛, "friend, strength"
祐豪, "help, overpowering"
由豪, "reason, overpowering"

The name can also be written in hiragana ゆうごう or katakana ユウゴウ.

Notable people with the name
, Japanese footballer
, Japanese manga artist
, Japanese music composer 
, Japanese badminton player
Yugo Kobayashi (footballer) (born 1991), Japanese footballer
, Japanese web designer
, Japanese voice actor
, Japanese shogi player
Yugo Miyajima (宮島 優心, born 2000), Japanese idol, member of Orbit, Produce 101 Japan contestant
, Japanese filmmaker
, Japanese speed skater

Fictional characters:
Yugo Ogami (大神 勇吾), a character in the video game series Bloody Roar
Yugo, a character in the anime series Yu-Gi-Oh! Arc-V
Yugo, a character in the manga series The Promised Neverland

Japanese masculine given names